Chanchal is a census town in Malda district in the state of West Bengal, India. It is the headquarters of the Chanchal subdivision.

Geography

Area overview
The area shown in the adjacent map covers two physiographic regions – the Barind in the east and the tal in the west. The eastern part is comparatively high (up to 40 metres above mean sea level at places) and uneven. The soils of the eastern region are “hard salty clays of a reddish hue and the ground is baked hard as iron.” It lies to the east of the Mahananda River. The area lying to the west of the Mahananda River, the tal, is a flat low land and “is strewn with innumerable marshes, bils and oxbow lakes.” The tal area is prone to flooding by local rivers. The total area is overwhelmingly rural. There are two important historical/ archaeological sites in the area – Pandua and Jagjivanpur.

Note: The map alongside presents some of the notable locations in the area. All places marked in the map are linked in the larger full screen map.

Location
Chanchal is the headquarter of the Chanchal subdivision. Also, the headquarter of the Chanchal–I CD block is here.

There is an announcement that Chanchal and Gazole would be amongst the 22 new municipalities to be formed in West Bengal. The matter has also been reported in the press, but till November 2018, there has been no formal announcement or notification.

Climate
Chanchal has three distinct seasons: summer, winter and monsoon. In summer the temperature sometimes reaches 45 degree Celsius. Winters are generally chilled and cool and sometimes temperature goes below 3 degree Celsius. During the monsoons (between June and September), the town is lashed by moderate to heavy rains.

History
It was the home of Raja Saratchandra Rai Bahadur, who built the Chanchal palace. The King was married to Queen Dakshyani. One part of the palace was transformed into a government college in 1969.The other part of the Palace is now Chanchal Subdivisional Court.

Demographics
According to the 2011 Census of India, Chanchal had a total population of 5,570, of which 2,287 (51%) were males and 2,743 (49%) were females. Population in the age range 0–6 years was 634. The total number of literate persons in Chanchal was 4,936 (78.04% of the population over 6 years).

Infrastructure
According to the District Census Handbook, Maldah, 2011, Chanchal covered an area of 1.7896 km2. The protected water-supply involved overhead tank, tube well/ borewell. It had 900 domestic electric connections, 400 road lighting points. Among the medical facilities it had 1 family welfare centre, 1 maternity & child welfare centre. Among the educational facilities, it had 1 primary school, 1 middle school, 1 secondary school, 1 higher secondary school, 1 general degree college. Among the social, cultural and recreational facilities it had 1 cinema theatre, 1 public library.

Civic administration

Police station
Chanchal police station under West Bengal police has jurisdiction over Chanchal I and Chanchal II CD blocks.

CD block HQ
The headquarters of Chanchal I CD block is at Chanchal.

Transport
Chanchal is on National Highway 31.

Roadways
Chanchal is connected by bus services like NBSTC and private buses to cities like Balurghat, Berhampore, Siliguri, Kolkata, Asansol, Raiganj, Malda, Dinhata, Suri, Ranaghat through National Highway 31 (India).

Education
Chanchal Siddheswari Institution
Chanchal College

Healthcare

Chanchal Super Speciality Hospital at Chanchal Roy Para, Chanchal (with blood bank and other digital facilities) is a major medical facility. There are primary health centres in Chanchal I CD Block at Kharba (with 10 beds) and Singia (Nadishik PHC) (with 10 beds).

Notable people
 Shibram Chakraborty

References

Cities and towns in Malda district
Tourist attractions in Malda district